Sexify (stylized as Sex!fy) is a Polish sex comedy streaming television series directed by Kalina Alabrudzińska and Piotr Domalewski and starring Sandra Drzymalska, Aleksandra Skraba and Maria Sobocińska as the lead characters. The first season of the show consisted of eight episodes, premiering on Netflix 29 April 2021. A second season of the show was released on January 11, 2023.

Plot
The show follows the character of computer science student Natalia Dumaka and her efforts to develop an algorithm for the female orgasm with the help of her friends Paulina and Monika. Natalia dreams of winning the competition for the best start-up at her university. With the help of her friends Paulina Malinowska and Monika Nowicka, she decides to create an app called Sexify, which aims to help people discover the world of sexuality and female orgasm.

Cast
 Aleksandra Skraba as Natalia Dumała
 Maria Sobocińska as Paulina Malinowska
 Sandra Drzymalska as Monika Nowicka
 Małgorzata Foremniak as Joanna Nowicka, Monika's mother
 Cezary Pazura as Marek Nowicki, Monika's father
 Zbigniew Zamachowski as dean Krzysztof Maślak
 Bartosz Gelner as Konrad
 Piotr Pacek as Mariusz, Paulina's fiancé
 Jan Wieteska as Adam, Lilith's brother, sex shop worker
 Sebastian Stankiewicz as "Jabba"
 Kamil Wodka as Rafał Paluch "Kripol"
 Edyta Torhan as Natalia's mother
 Magdalena Grąziowska as Lilith, sex shop owner
 Wojciech Solarz as Krynicki, PhD
 Izabela Kuna as Malgorzata Debska
 Dobromir Dymecki as Maks Oleksiak

Episodes

Season 1 (2021)

Season 2 (2023)

Reception 
Sexify has been described as "Poland's answer to Sex Education", a British Netflix show, due to how it addresses the topic of sexuality in an educational setting. The series has been characterised in Anglophone media as an international success, having charted in Netflix's top 10 in 80 countries.

References

External links
 
 

2020 Polish television series debuts
2020s comedy-drama television series
2020s Polish television series
2020s sex comedy television series
Polish comedy-drama television series
Polish-language Netflix original programming